This Is Tomas (Spanish: ¿Conoces a Tomás?) is a 2019 Mexican comedy film directed by María Torres. The film stars Hoze Meléndez, Leonardo Ortizgris, Marcela Guirado, and Alan Estrada.

Plot 
Tomás (Hoze Meléndez), is a young man with autism who is taken unexpectedly by his brother-in-law (Leonardo Ortizgris), a versatile group musician, to a wedding. Along the way, Tomás will discover a world he did not know.

Cast 
 Hoze Meléndez as Tomás
 Leonardo Ortizgris as Leonardo
 Marcela Guirado as Fernanda
 Alan Estrada as Christopher
 Pamela Almanza as Yovanna
 María Evoli as Roxanna
 Martha Claudia Moreno as Doña Rosa
 Juan Pablo Medina as Don T
 Úrsula Pruneda as Pati
 Eligio Meléndez as Reparador

References

External links 
 

Mexican comedy films
2010s Mexican films